Colombini is an Italian family name. It may refer to:

Aldo Colombini, Italian-born American magician
Gino Colombini (born 1915), Italian architect and industrial designer
Giovanni Colombini
Giovanni Colombini (Founder of the Congregation of Jesuati) (c. 1300–1367), Italian merchant, the founder of the Congregation of Jesuati
Giovanni Colombini (painter) (c. 1700–1774), Italian painter
Giulia Molino Colombini (1812-1879), Italian poet and educator
Ignacio Colombini (born 1992), Argentine professional footballer
Ugo Colombini (born 1967), former Italian professional tennis player and sports agent

Astronomy
7030 Colombini, main-belt asteroid discovered on December 18, 1993 by Vagnozzi, A. at Stroncone

Italian-language surnames

it:Colombini